Clarence Self Ridley (June 22, 1883 – July 26, 1969) served as the Governor of the Panama Canal Zone from 1936 to 1940.

Biography
Ridley was born in Corydon, Indiana on June 22, 1883, to Judge William Ridley.

Ridley graduated fourth in a class of 114 from the United States Military Academy at West Point in 1905. He was commissioned second lieutenant in the U.S. Army Corps of Engineers. In 1917, Ridley was appointed senior military aide to President Wilson.  He supervised construction of the Lincoln Memorial. After World War I, Ridley graduated from the Command and General Staff School in 1925, the Army War College in 1931 and the Army Industrial College in 1932. He then served as an instructor at the Army Industrial College.

Ridley served as Governor of the Panama Canal Zone from 1936 to 1940. He was promoted to brigadier general effective October 1, 1938 and received a temporary promotion to major general on February 14, 1941. During World War II, he was commanding general of the 6th Infantry Division from January 1941 to August 1942. Ridley then served as chief of the U.S. Military Mission to Iran from 1942 to 1946, for which he was awarded the Army Distinguished Service Medal, the citation for which reads:

His promotion to major general was made permanent on February 27, 1947 and he retired from active duty on June 30, 1947 after forty-two years of service.

Ridley died on July 26, 1969, in Carmel, California. He was buried at the West Point Cemetery on October 21, 1969.

References

1883 births
1969 deaths
People from Corydon, Indiana
United States Military Academy alumni
Military personnel from Indiana
United States Army Corps of Engineers personnel
Military aides to the President of the United States
United States Army personnel of World War I
20th-century American engineers
United States Army Command and General Staff College alumni
United States Army War College alumni
Dwight D. Eisenhower School for National Security and Resource Strategy alumni
Canal executives
Governors of the Panama Canal Zone
United States Army generals
United States Army generals of World War II
Recipients of the Distinguished Service Medal (US Army)
Burials at West Point Cemetery